Jaunti is a village situated in northwestern outer Delhi toward Haryana. It is in North west constituency of Delhi.

Connection
It is well connected via road to Delhi and adjoining state Haryana. The Public transport (beside private vehicles) is main medium of commuting. It has regular service by DTC buses.

Facilities
The village has a veterinary hospital, medical dispensary, post office, bank (State bank of India), senior secondary school, boys primary school, girls primary school, stadium, park, temples, field for agriculture and two Panchayat houses.

==History
Jaunti has a medieval time fort and a very large pond (popularly called Talab). The fort was built during reign of Mughal emperor AKBAR, this village and its surrounding was densely forested with deer, antelope, and oxen.  The site was hunting expedition for the Mughal king. There is a myth that the fort is connected to the pond via tunnels.

In 1964, M. S. Swaminathan organized a seed development project in the village to produce high-yielding varieties of seeds. The Jounti Seed Village helped to rapidly produce good quality seeds of high-yielding varieties of wheat, thereby hastening the onset of the wheat revolution in India.

References

Villages in North West Delhi district